John Michael Evans (27 July 1920 – 4 September 2007) was an English actor best known for starring in the original 1951 Broadway production of Gigi with Audrey Hepburn, and later as Colonel Douglas Austin on the American soap opera The Young and the Restless.

Biography
Evans was born on 27 July 1920 in Sittingbourne, Kent; to John Evans, a cricketer and First World War Royal Flying Corps pilot and double prisoner-of-war escapee who wrote the 1926 novel, The Escaping Club, and his wife, the former Marie Galbraith, an Irish concert violinist. Evans later told the Toronto Star in a 1992 interview on his return to "My Fair Lady" touring Russia, that aged 12, he decided to be an actor after seeing Sir John Gielgud on stage in "Richard II".

During the Second World War he was a Royal Air Force navigator, and flew during the Blitz. He returned to Winchester College and graduated in 1943, and then studied acting with the Old Vic company, with whom he made his stage debut in London's West End theatre in 1948 as a member of the Old Vic company.

Evans then moved to United States, making his New York debut in the Broadway theatre production of "Ring Round the Moon". Evans then played opposite a young Audrey Hepburn in "Gigi" in 1951. He then took on the role of Henry Higgins in a touring production of My Fair Lady.
Evans returned to Broadway in Mary, Mary and made the move to Hollywood when he took a role in Bye Bye Birdie (1963). While in Hollywood, he took on many guest starring roles in shows such as: The Man from U.N.C.L.E., Combat!, Perry Mason and his best known television role as Colonel Douglas Austin on The Young and the Restless. In the early '80s he played Britain's greatest detective, "Sherlock Holmes" in "Sherlock and Me".

Personal life
In 1948, Evans married Pat Wedgewood. The couple had two sons (Nick and Christopher), and divorced in 1983. His second wife, Pat Sigris Evans, died in 1995, with whom he had no children. 

Evans died in a Woodland Hills assisted-living facility on 4 September 2007, of complications related to age. He was buried in Forest Lawn – Hollywood Hills Cemetery.

Select filmography

References

External links
 
 

1920 births
2007 deaths
People from Sittingbourne
People educated at Winchester College
Royal Air Force officers
English male stage actors
English male television actors
Burials at Forest Lawn Memorial Park (Hollywood Hills)
Male actors from Kent
Royal Air Force personnel of World War II